Cosmethella is a genus of snout moths. It was described by Eugene G. Munroe and M. Shaffer in 1980.

Species
Cosmethella major Munroe & Shaffer, 1980
Cosmethella minor Munroe & Shaffer, 1980
Cosmethella unipectinalis (Hampson, 1906)

References

Pyralinae
Pyralidae genera
Taxa named by Eugene G. Munroe